John Mouat Turner (28 May 1900 – 24 February 1945) was a Canadian politician.

Life
He was born in Beausejour, Manitoba and sold brewery products for a living and also worked as a hotel manager in Winnipeg. He was first elected to the House of Commons of Canada in the 1935 federal election representing the Manitoba riding of Springfield as a Liberal. He was re-elected in the 1940 federal election. He was nominated to run in the 1945 federal election but died of a heart attack several months before the election.

In Parliament he was an advocate for rural electrification, the development of natural resources, the lifting of restrictions on beer and the development of industry in Western Canada.

References

External links

Manitoba Historical Society biography

1900 births
1945 deaths
Members of the House of Commons of Canada from Manitoba
Liberal Party of Canada MPs
People from Eastman Region, Manitoba